Sormonne is a commune in the Ardennes department and Grand Est region of north-eastern France.

Geography
The river Sormonne, a left tributary of the Meuse, flows through the commune.

Population

See also
Communes of the Ardennes department

References

Communes of Ardennes (department)
Ardennes communes articles needing translation from French Wikipedia